Drübeck is a village and a former municipality in the district of Harz, in Saxony-Anhalt, Germany. Since 1 July 2009, it is part of the town Ilsenburg.

Abbey 

It is the site of a former monastery of nuns of the Order of Saint Benedict, first mentioned as Drubechi ("Three Brooks") in a 960 deed by Emperor Otto I. At this time, the Romanesque abbey church was built, today a landmark at the Romanesque tourist route (Straße der Romanik) of Saxony-Anhalt. After the monastery became extinct in the Thirty Years' War, the estates were acquired by the Counts of Stolberg-Wernigerode, who established a Protestant congregation of canonesses here in 1732, now a conference centre of the Evangelical Church of the Church Province of Saxony.

Former municipalities in Saxony-Anhalt
Ilsenburg